Hariom Verma (popularly known as Hariom) is an Indian politician who is serving as Member of 18th Uttar Pradesh Assembly from Amanpur Assembly constituency. In 2022 Uttar Pradesh Legislative Assembly election, he got 96,377 or 50.4% votes.

Personal life 
His age is 37 years and his profession is agriculture land and jigsaw machine work.

References 

Year of birth missing (living people)
Living people